Oxford United F.C. season 2012–13 was the club's third season in League Two after returning from the Conference. Oxford United had finished 9th in League Two in 2011–12 and failed to improve on this position in 2012–13. The club's opening nine league fixtures, consisting of three wins followed by six defeats, set the tone of a campaign in which the club were never serious contenders for a playoff place and which alternated between winning and losing streaks; a case in point was the three-game run of victories at the end of the season after the possibility of promotion had disappeared, which put a somewhat flattering gloss on Oxford's final position. They were knocked out by higher-division opposition in the early rounds of both the FA Cup and League Cup (including elimination at the hands of Sheffield United from the former competition for the second year in succession), but reached the Area Semi-final of the Football League Trophy and won the Oxfordshire Senior Cup.

It was the club's first season under the chairmanship of owner Ian Lenagan, who had taken over from Kelvin Thomas in the previous close season. James Constable finished the season as overall top scorer for the fifth consecutive season with 14 goals (9 in the league), while Alfie Potter and Tom Craddock jointly topped the list of League scorers, with 10 League goals apiece. During the season, veteran defender Michael Duberry overtook the club record for the oldest first-team outfield player, his final appearance coming in the last game of the season against Accrington Stanley at the age of 37 years and 195 days.

It was the club's 119th year in existence, their 113th of competitive football and their 64th since turning professional. This article covers the period from 1 July 2012 to 30 June 2013.

Team kit
The previous season was the last in a three-year deal with Nike Inour kit.
The club's main sponsor for the 2012–13 season was Bridle Insurance, an Oxfordshire-based insurance company.

Match fixtures and results

Pre-season friendlies

League Two
For more information on this season's Football League Two, see 2012–13 Football League Two. Oxford United's home games are played at the Kassam Stadium.

Results

Results summary

Results by round

FA Cup

Football League Cup

Football League Trophy

Oxfordshire Senior Cup

Squad statistics

Appearances and goals

Top scorers

Disciplinary record

Transfers

References

2012-13
2012–13 Football League Two by team